Metropolin (מטרופולין) are an Israeli alternative pop and synth-pop band.

The band was assembled in 2005 by Ofer Meiri, an Israeli musician and music producer. He gathered several renowned Israeli musicians – namely Efrat Gosh and Dana Berger – as guest vocalists. Efrat Gosh, although not officially a member of Metropolin, is the main singer on several of its more popular tracks, and continues to frequently appear with the band in gigs.

The band has become immensely successful in Israel, riding on the popularity of tracks from the self-titled album: "Angels", "Without Saying A Word" (Shalom Hanoch cover), "Doesn't Say Anything" and "Sleeping Without Dreams". These tracks also received high amounts of airtime (broadcasting) in Israel Defense Forces Radio and Galgalatz.

Metropolin reached Gold status and won the 2006 Israel Album of the Year contest.

Musical style
The Metropolin sound features heavy use of synthesis, with more traditional rock instruments on top. Of the band's highly successful songs, most – such as "Without A Word", "Angels" and "Dreamless Sleeping" – open with a synthesizer solo.

Lyrics are dark and urban. Singing is often warm and feminine, but rather dynamic.

Members
The line up consists, of:
Ofer Meiri – vocals, keyboards
Barak Gabizon – vocals
Dana Adini – vocals
Roni Alter – vocals
Amitay Asher – guitar
Michael Frost – bass
Tomer Tsidkiyahu – drums

Discography

Studio albums
Metropolin (2005)
The helix ("Haslil") (2007)
The third ("Hashlishi") (2012)

Singles
Pigs
Chazirim / חזירים
("Metropolin", 2005)
Doesn't Say Anything
Lo Omeret Klum / לא אומרת כלום
("Metropolin", 2005)
Sleeping Without Dreams
Lishon B'li Lachlom / לישון בלי לחלום
(With Dana Berger. "Metropolin", 2005)
Without Saying A Word
Bli Lomar Mila / בלי לומר מילה
("Metropolin", 2005)
Angels (Incitement)
Malachim (Hasata) / מלאכים ‏(הסתה)‏
("Metropolin", 2005)
I Have No Place
Ain Li Makom / אין לי מקום
(With Dana Adini. "The Helix", 2008)

References

Israeli alternative rock groups
Musical groups reestablished in 2005
Musical groups from Tel Aviv